The Department of Telecommunications, abbreviated to DoT, is a department of the Ministry of Communications of the executive branch of the Government of India.

History
Telecom services have been recognized the world-over as an important tool for socio-economic development for a nation and hence telecom infrastructure is treated as a crucial factor to realize the socio-economic objectives in India. Accordingly, the Department of Telecom has been formulating developmental policies for the accelerated growth of the telecommunication services. The department is also responsible for grant of licenses for various telecom services like Unified Access Service Internet and VSAT service. The department is also responsible for frequency management in the field of radio communication in close coordination with the international bodies. It also enforces wireless regulatory measures by monitoring wireless transmission of all users in the country.

Statutory Bodies 

 Telecom Disputes Settlement and Appellate Tribunal(TDSAT)
 Telecom Regulatory Authority of India(TRAI)

Attached Offices 

 Telecommunication Engineering Centre(TEC)
 Universal Service Obligation Fund(USOF)

Subordinate Offices 

 Wireless Monitoring Organization

Field Offices 

 Director General Telecom
 Controller of Communication Accounts(CCA)

Autonomous Bodies 

 Centre for Development of Telematics(C-DOT)

Training Institutes 

 National Telecommunications Institute for Policy Research Innovation Training(NTIPRIT)
 National Institute of Communication Finance(NICF)

Specialised Units
The following units function under the DoT:

Telecom Enforcement Resource and Monitoring (TERM) Cells, formerly Vigilance Telecom Monitoring (VTM)
Wireless Planning & Coordination Wing (WPC)
Telephone Advisory Committees

Central Public Sector Undertakings 
Bharat Sanchar Nigam Limited (BSNL)
Indian Telephone Industries Limited (ITI)
Telecommunications Consultants India Limited (TCIL)
Bharat Broadband Network Limited (BBNL)

See also

Central Civil Services
 Indian Communication Finance Service

Central Engineering Services
 Indian Telecommunications Service
 Indian Radio Regulatory Service

References

External links
Official site

Ministry of Communications and Information Technology (India)
Telecommunications in India
Telecommunications authorities of India
Cyber Security in India